Give You My World is the first album recorded and released independently by Phil Wickham.  Produced by Wickham and his father and recorded in a small home studio. The album gained popularity quickly, especially in the Calvary Chapel affiliation.

Give You My World has two songs that have been recorded on other projects by Wickham. "Jesus Lord of Heaven" was also featured on the 2001 album, Worship Generation as well as Wickham's second major release, Cannons. The song "Shining" is also revisited on Cannons.

Background
Encouraged by his father, Wickham recorded his first independent CD, Give You My World, in his late teens, and it was met with a good response. Although Wickham said it had no formal marketing, Give You My World found its way around the country—and that included selections sung at The Vine. ”I have no idea how they got it” Wickham said.

Comparison
"The style of his music is very evocative of bands like Jars of Clay and Lifehouse and this album would definitely appeal to fans of that genre, but the strong worship style of his songwriting and emotional vocals would also make this album sit nicely alongside a Matt Redman CD." Cross Rhythms.

"In attempts to describe Wickham's music, writers have made comparisons to the British band Coldplay, singer/songwriter Rufus Wainwright and Queen's frontman Freddie Mercury. Wickham laughed, adding, ”I like Coldplay. I like Freddie Mercury, so that's a compliment.” In truth, Wickham said, his sound probably is that broad. He said he’s influenced by artists who are honest, bare their hearts and take a fresh approach to song writing—and that covers a multitude of genres." Southeast Christian.

Critical reception
Give You My World has received positive reviews from Cross Rhythms. Heather Marsden: "All his songs feature powerful lyrics with really strong choruses and catchy riffs... From the opening bars of the first song to the last note on the album you can tell this is something special, all I can say is try and get hold of a copy."

Track listing
Give You My World

Personnel
Phil Wickham – vocals, guitars
Sean Cimino – guitars, background vocals
Eddie Gonzalez – bass
Paul Droste – drums

Additional musicians
Evan Wickham – acoustic piano, synth, guitars, background vocals
John Wickham – electric guitar
Joel Plotnik – percussion
Darrel Cook – bass
Fred Field – fiddle, mandolin

References

2003 debut albums
Phil Wickham albums